The Quitter is a 1929 film from Columbia Pictures directed by Joseph Henabery starring Ben Lyon, Dorothy Revier and Fred Kohler.

This film is thought to be lost.

Cast
Ben Lyon as Neal Abbott
Dorothy Revier as Patricia
Fred Kohler as Duffy Thompson
Charles McHugh as Shorty
Sherry Hall as Nick
Jacqueline Gadsden as Doris
Henry Otto as Dr. Abbott
Claire McDowell as Mrs. Abbott

References

External links
 
 
 
 

1929 films
1920s English-language films
Columbia Pictures films
Lost American films
American silent feature films
American black-and-white films
Silent American drama films
Films directed by Joseph Henabery
1929 drama films
1929 lost films
Lost drama films
1920s American films